Presidential elections are scheduled to be held on Monday 9 September 2023. Incumbent president Ibrahim Mohamed Solih will be seeking re-election, after defeating Speaker of the People's Majlis,Mohamed Nasheed in the Maldivian Democratic Party primaries. Former president Abdulla Yameen of the Progressive Party of Maldives and former Minister of Defence and National Security, Mohamed Nazim of the Maldives National Party have announced their candidacies for president. Jumhooree Party have announced that they will put forth candidates as well.

Electoral system
The Maldives has Presidential system of government where the president is both head of state and government. Once in office, they could be re-elected to a second 5-year term, which is the limit allowed by the Constitution. 

In the Maldives, the president is elected by a majority or more than fifty (50%) percent of the votes cast. When a candidate does not receive a majority of the votes, the election then proceeds to a runoff (or second round), which are mandated to be held no less than 21 days following the election. In a runoff round, the candidates among the two who receives fifty (50%) percent of the valid votes cast, are elected to the office of the president. 

The official results of the voting are announced by the Elections Commission and published in the government gazette within seven days of the voting day of the presidential elections.

Candidates

Confirmed

Maldivian Democratic Party
The Maldivian Democratic Party held primary elections to choose its presidential candidate on 28 January 2023.  Nasheed accused Solih of trying to rig the presidential primary. The Chairperson of Maldivian Democratic Party, Fayyaz Ismail, defended the primaries, reiterating that they will be held in accordance with the party constitution.

 Ibrahim Mohamed Solih, incumbent president and member of Maldivian Democratic Party.
 Mohamed Nasheed, incumbent speaker of the People's Majlis and leader of Maldivian Democratic Party.

Progressive Party of Maldives–People's National Congress 
Nominated by Progressive Party of Maldives and People's National Congress.

 Abdulla Yameen, former president and leader of Progressive Party of Maldives.

Maldives National Party 
Nominated by Maldives National Party.

 Mohamed Nazim, former Minister of Defence and National Security and leader of Maldives National Party.

Jumhooree Party 
Finalized by Jumhooree Party's council meeting 

 Qasim Ibrahim, former parliament speaker of People's Majlis and leader of Jumhooree Party.

References

2023 in the Maldives
Maldives
Presidential elections in the Maldives